Sri Guru Nanak Dev Khalsa College is a constituent college of University of Delhi which offers courses in Commerce and Humanities at undergraduate and postgraduate levels. The College was established in 1973 and is named after first Guru of the Sikhs and functions under the able management of Delhi Sikh Gurudwara Management Committee. The college has been granted minority status by the National Commission for Minority Education institutions. The College is located in Guru Ravi Das Marg, Block 4, Dev Nagar, Karol Bagh, New Delhi, Delhi 110005.

Previously, it was known as Sri Guru Tegh Bahadur Khalsa College (Evening). It is also popularly known as SGND Khalsa or SGNDK in order avoid confusion with Sri Guru Tegh Bahadur Khalsa College.

Courses offered

Bachelor of Science (Honors) Mathematics
Bachelor of Commerce (Honors)
Bachelor of Commerce (Programme)
B.A. with Hons in Business Economics
B.A. with Hons in English
B.A. with Hons in Hindi 
B.A. with Hons in Hindi Journalism and Mass Communication
B.A. with Hons in History
B.A. with Hons in Political Science
B.A. with Hons in Punjabi
B.A. Programme
M.A. (Punjabi)
M.Com.

Societies

Academic Societies
Asankh - The Mathematics Society
Udyamita - The Entrepreneurship Cell
Vanaj- The Commerce Society 
Kirt- The Economics Society
Sofica- Society for Financial Literacy & Consumer Awareness
Vedang - debating and quizzing society
Encore- The English Society
Virsa- The History Society
Civil Society - The Political Science Society
Hindi Sahitya Sabha
Punjabi Sahitya Sabha

Extra Curricular Societies
AnC- The Arts & Culture Society 
Certatus- Model United Nations Society 
Photobug - The Photography and Videography Society
Nepathya - The Dramatics Society
Vedang- The Debating and Quizzing Society
Sarbloh warriors - The Gatka Society
Magus - The Western Dance Society 
Vijyant - The NCC Club 
NSS Wing
Cyber Clan - The I.T. Society
Musoc- The Music Society 
Impasto- The Fine Arts Society
The Bhangra Society

Unit
Leaders For Tomorrow SGND Unit.
The college has an Equal Opportunity Cell (EOC) and Students' Union for the welfare of students.

Surlok: The Annual Festival of SGND Khalsa College 
The College organises an inter-college annual festival "Surlok" every year which witnesses a footfall of thousands of college students from Delhi NCR participating in various competitions including Street Play, Western Dance, Folk Dance, Solo Singing,  as well as fun activities like Dubsmash, Blind Date etc. ranging over 3 Days.

The Annual Convention 2016 
In March 2016, the college organised its Annual convention on the theme-" Startup India: The Road Ahead" to promote the entrepreneurial ecosystem among the college students. The Convention witnessed the likes of entrepreneurial pioneers including Dr. Ritesh Malik (Forbes Asia Top 30 under 30 entrepreneur), Sachin Garg (Best Selling Indian Author), Ajay Chaturvedi (Founder, HarVa) and many others.

Sports
Every year, the college organises the Annual Sports Day at Thyagraj Stadium, Delhi which witnesses huge participation from students and the teachers across wide variety of indoor and outdoor games which had been graced by some of the renowned sports personalities including Ms. Asha Aggarwal (Arjuna Awardee,Indian Women Marathon Champion) etc.

Infrastructure

College Library
The college library not only houses some 73366 books but also subscribes to more than fifty National & International Journals and Magazines.

See also
Education in India
Literacy in India
List of institutions of higher education in Delhi

References

External links
Official College Website
www.du.ac.in

Delhi University
Universities and colleges in Delhi
Memorials to Guru Nanak
1973 establishments in Delhi
Educational institutions established in 1953